Galgeberg is a neighbourhood in the borough of Gamle Oslo in Oslo, Norway.

The neighbourhood lies near Vålerenga, Kampen and Gamlebyen. The name stems from the gallows present at the location in earlier times.

References

Neighbourhoods of Oslo